Legends of Valhalla: Thor, also known as Thor: Legend of the Magical Hammer, is a 2011 3D CGI animated comedy feature film co-produced by CAOZ, Ulysses and Magma Films. It is based on stories about Thor, the god of thunder from Norse mythology. The film is the first full-length animated film to be produced in Iceland. It was released on October 14, 2011 in Reykjavík.

The film was released on DVD in North America on March 19, 2013.

Plot summary
The young blacksmith Thor lives happily with his single mother in a peaceful little village. The legend says he is the son of Odin, the King of the Gods. Therefore, the fellow villagers believe that the terrifying Giants will never attack them. But they are terribly mistaken. A Giant army crushes the village and takes the villagers to Hel, the Queen of the Underworld. Thor is knocked out and left behind. He sets out to save his friends with the hammer Crusher - who claims to be a magical weapon!

Cast
Justin Gregg as Thor
Woongpyo as Crusher
Nicola Coughlan as Edda
Liz Lloyd as Hel
Alan Stanford as Odinn
Emmett J Scanlan as Sindri
J. Drew Lucas as Thrym
Mary Murray as Freyja
Lesa Thurman as Mother
Gary Hetzler as Grandfather
Hillary Kavanagh as Old Age

References

External links 

 Legends of Valhalla at NordicFantasy

2011 films
2010s Icelandic-language films
CAOZ films
2011 computer-animated films
German animated fantasy films
Icelandic animated fantasy films
Irish animated fantasy films
Animated comedy films
2010s fantasy comedy films
Films about Thor
2011 comedy films
Animated films based on Norse mythology
Films directed by Toby Genkel
2010s English-language films
2010s German films
2011 multilingual films
Icelandic multilingual films
German multilingual films
Irish multilingual films